Richard Britton (born October 13, 1976) is a retired Grenadian athlete who specialized in 400 metres, he represented Grenada as part of its first Olympic 4 × 400m Relay team which was disqualified at the 1996 Summer Olympics.

Competition record

References

 

1976 births
Living people
Grenadian male sprinters
Athletes (track and field) at the 1996 Summer Olympics
Olympic athletes of Grenada